Fulvibacter is a Gram-negative, rod-shaped and non-motile genus of bacteria from the family of Flavobacteriaceae with one known species (Fulvibacter tottoriensis).

References

Flavobacteria
Bacteria genera
Monotypic bacteria genera
Taxa described in 2008